Faugh-a-Ballagh (foaled 1841 in Ireland) was a Thoroughbred racehorse. A brother to Birdcatcher, Faugh-a-Ballagh was sold to E. J. Erwin in 1842. He ran once as a two-year-old at the Doncaster's Champagne Stakes, finishing third to The Cure and Sorella. He then began his three-year-old season as the first Irish-bred horse to win the St. Leger Stakes, then beat Corona in a match race.  He won the Grand Duke Michael Stakes, then the Cesarewitch, and came second to Evenus at the Cambridgeshire. As a four-year-old, he finished second to The Emperor in the Emperor of Russia's Plate.

In 1855, Faugh-a-Ballagh was exported to France. There he sired Fille de l'air, The Oaks and French Oaks winner. He also sired the great stallion Leamington, that sired the American racehorse and leading sire Longfellow, as well as Iroquois, the first American-bred horse to win The Derby.

References

 Faugh-a-Ballagh's pedigree and partial racing stats
 Faugh-a-Ballagh at Thoroughbred heritage

1841 racehorse births
Racehorses bred in Ireland
Racehorses trained in Ireland
Thoroughbred family 11-d
St Leger winners